How the World Sees America is a video blog run by global correspondent Amar C. Bakshi and sponsored by The Washington Post and Newsweek Magazine. It features daily articles, which include text and short video clips, about citizens around the world impacted by the United States politically, economically and culturally.

History
The project launched on May 15, 2007 in England, and wrapped up in Mexico in March 2008.

Countries Covered
How England Sees America
How India Sees America
How Pakistan Sees America
How Turkey Sees America
How Lebanon Sees America
How Israel Sees America
How The Philippines Sees America
How South Korea Sees America
How Venezuela Sees America
How Mexico Sees America

References

External links
How the World Sees America  Official Site
NPR Interview
New America Foundation: How World Youth See America
Fareed Zakaria calls it "fascinating and groundbreaking"
Amar Bakshi's Website

American studies
American political blogs
Anti-Americanism